Dharmam Engey is a 1972 Indian Tamil-language action film directed by A. C. Tirulokchandar. The film stars Sivaji Ganesan and Jayalalithaa, with R. Muthuraman, Kumari Padmini and M. N. Nambiar in supporting roles. It was released on 15 July 1972.

Plot 

In a village, Rajasekaran works in the field picking and selling flowers. Maarthaandan is the tyrant ruler who exploits the villagers. Rajasekaran becomes their leader, rebels against Maarthaandan and ultimately succeeds.

Cast 
Sivaji Ganesan as Rajasekaran
Jayalalithaa as Roopa
R. Muthuraman as Boopathy
Kumari Padmini as Vani
M. N. Nambiar as Maarthaandan
S. V. Ramadas as Captain
Nagesh as Kurka
Senthamarai as Captain
Haalam as Dancer

Production 
The film was shot at Thiruchopuram at Cuddalore, and AVM Studios in Madras.

Soundtrack 
The music was composed by M. S. Viswanathan, with lyrics by Kannadasan.

Release and reception 
Dharmam Engey was released on 15 July 1972, delayed from April. The film was not successful commercially because, according to historian Randor Guy, "critics and cinemagoers felt that it was a movie that would have suited MGR better."

References

External links 
 

1970s Tamil-language films
1972 action films
1972 films
Films directed by A. C. Tirulokchandar
Films scored by M. S. Viswanathan
Indian action films